William Lawson Robb (23 December 1927 – 18 May 2002) was a Scottish professional footballer who played as a wing half. Active between 1949 and 1958, Robb made over 200 appearances in the Scottish and English League systems.

Career
Born in Cambuslang, Robb played junior football with local side Cambuslang Rangers, before turning professional in 1949 with Aberdeen. Robb later played for Leyton Orient, Albion Rovers and Bradford City, before returning to junior football with Rutherglen Glencairn.

References

External links

1927 births
2002 deaths
Scottish footballers
Cambuslang Rangers F.C. players
Aberdeen F.C. players
Leyton Orient F.C. players
Albion Rovers F.C. players
Bradford City A.F.C. players
Rutherglen Glencairn F.C. players
Scottish Football League players
English Football League players
Association football wing halves
Sportspeople from Cambuslang
Scottish Junior Football Association players
Footballers from South Lanarkshire